Port-Lesney is a commune in the Jura department' in Bourgogne-Franche-Comté in eastern France. It lies on both banks of the river Loue.

Population

See also
Communes of the Jura department

References

Communes of Jura (department)